The following television stations broadcast on digital channel 14 in Mexico:

 XEX-TDT on Altzomoni, State of Mexico
 XHADO-TDT in Adivino, Sonora
 XHALS-TDT in Atil, Sonora
 XHAO-TDT in San Cristóbal de las Casas, Chiapas
 XHAZP-TDT in Arizpe, Sonora
 XHBC-TDT in Mexicali, Baja California
 XHBCA-TDT in Bacanora, Sonora
 XHBCI-TDT in Bacoachi, Sonora
 XHBNI-TDT in Bacadehuachi, Sonora
 XHBNL-TDT in Benjamín Hill, Sonora
 XHBVA-TDT in Baviacora, Sonora
 XHBVE-TDT in Bavispe, Sonora
 XHCOJ-TDT in Ciudad Obregón, Sonora
 XHCTTO-TDT in Toluca, State of Mexico
 XHGDP-TDT in Torreón, Coahuila
 XHHCH-TDT in Huachineras, Sonora
 XHIE-TDT in Acapulco, Guerrero
 XHMDS-TDT in Magdalena de Kino, Sonora
 XHMOR-TDT in Morelia, Michoacán
 XHNCO-TDT in Nácori Chico, Sonora
 XHNGE-TDT in Nácori Grande, Sonora
 XHONV-TDT in Onavas, Sonora
 XHRPS-TDT in Cucurpe, Sonora
 XHSAM-TDT in Sahuayo-Jiquilpan, Michoacán
 XHSCZ-TDT in Santa Cruz, Sonora
 XHSECE-TDT in Querétaro, Querétaro
 XHSIC-TDT in Saric, Sonora
 XHSJR-TDT in San Javier, Sonora
 XHSPE-TDT in San Pedro de la Cueva, Sonora
 XHSPRMT-TDT in Monterrey, Nuevo León
 XHSPRUM-TDT in Uruapan, Michoacán
 XHSSE-TDT in Sasabe, Sonora
 XHSYT-TDT in Sonoita, Sonora
 XHTAO-TDT in Tampico, Tamaulipas
 XHTCE-TDT in Tepache, Sonora
 XHTHI-TDT in Tula, Hidalgo
 XHUES-TDT in Ures, Sonora
 XHVHO-TDT in Villa Hidalgo, Sonora
 XHYES-TDT in Yécora, Sonora

14